Xie is a Chinese-language surname. lt is usually romanized as "Hsieh" in Taiwan. It is estimated that there are more than ten million people with this surname, the majority of whom live in Taiwan, Southern China, South East Asia, America, Europe and Africa. It is particularly common in Taiwan where it is the  13th most common surname in 2016. It is also very common in the east Asian diaspora which historically tended to have  disproportionately emigrated out of southern China. A 2013 study found that Xie was the 23rd most common surname in China, with 0.79% of the population having this surname. In 2019 it was again the 23rd most common surname in Mainland China. 
The majority of Xie are from south of China. It is the 34th name on the Hundred Family Surnames poem.

The surname originated in two major branches: during the Three Sovereigns and Five Emperors period, and near the end of the Western Zhou Dynasty. It was a prominent aristocratic clan in the Eastern Jin dynasty of China. The hometown of the Xie is Kaifeng, Henan Province.

Variations

The spelling of the same Chinese character using Wade–Giles romanization is Hsieh. The spelling "Hsieh" is most commonly used in Taiwan and in older romanizations, particularly by older generations of the Chinese and Taiwanese diaspora, for instance in the United States. "Hsieh" has been often phonologically adapted to  "Shay" in English-speaking society, for instance in the United States, as a result of anglicisation. Other variations are pronounced "Sh'eh" and the spelling is sometimes modified as Shieh.

The Cantonese spelling of the same Chinese character is Tse or Tze and the Taishanese spelling of the same Chinese character is Dea, Der, Dare, or Dear. The Teochew and Hokkien spelling of the same Chinese character is Chia, Shia, Cheah, or Sia.

In Malaysia and Singapore, the name is most commonly Chia, although Cheah, Seah, Sia, Shia, Cha, Tse, Chay, etc. can also be found. During the Chinese diaspora, the region was administered by British Empire clerks, who knew little about Chinese dialects, often had to find their own romanizations. As a result, the variations are non-exhaustive.

In the Philippines, the name is also spelled as Sese (which also means thank you in Kapampangan, the language in Pampanga, where the first Xie settled), which is also a variation in the rest of the ASEAN region, Taiwan, and South Korea. In Indonesia, the name is also spelt as Tjhia or Tjia. In East Timor, as a legacy of Portuguese colonialism and lingua franca, Xie is also produced as Tchia, Tchea, Tsia, Tcha, and Tjea. The Vietnamese version is Tạ.

In the United States, the name is sometimes spelled as Jair and Zia. Other variations of the surname include Shea and Shei.

Variation table

Origins and history

During the legendary Three Sovereigns and Five Emperors period, the Xie were believed to be the descendants of Yuyang, son of the Yellow Emperor. Yuyang's descendants founded ten states successively, the State of Xie (谢) first, and its occupants becoming the first Xie.

For the purpose of reciprocating his mother's upbringing, King Xuan of Zhou (r. 827 – 782 BCE) of the Western Zhou Dynasty granted the former State of Xie, in modern Nanyang, Henan province, to his maternal uncle Shen Boxi, the Marquess of Shen, whose line claimed descent from the semi-mythological character Bo Yi. The people of Xie later adopted the name of the state as their surname.

In the Eastern Jin dynasty, the Xie were among the cluster of noble clans who fled to the south in the wake of the fall of Chang'an, dominating the court thereafter.
The legend has it that it derived from Yellow Emperor Tribe: almost vanished in “Xia, Shang, Zhou” Dynasty.
The legend has it that it derived from Ren Clan in Xie State, descendant of Yellow Emperor, It takes the State name as Clan. Its land was manor of Shen Bo until Zhou Dynasty got perished, the descendant of Shen Bo took the State name as Clan.
Derived from Yan Emperor Tribe: the Ancestor Shen Bo is generally acknowledged by contemporary Xie Clan.
Derived from Jiang Clan, came from the inherited manor Xie for the descendant of Yan Emperor and Shen Bo, it takes the State name as Clan. The royal descendant of State Shen who takes the place name as Clan, called Xie Clan, its so-called Henan Xie Clan, known as Xie Clan Orthodox in history. Most of the contemporary Xie Clan people respects Shen Bo as the first ancestor. 
Changed into Zhile Clan.

The litterateur Xie Yan in late Sui Dynasty and early Tang Dynasty(? — 643), changed Xie into Zhi Le, his grandfather Xiao Zheng was emperor’s regular attendant of horse riding, restored to Xie after Sui Dynasty.

The compound surname of Xieqiu, derived from Ji Clan, came from the manor Xie Shui which was granted by King Xuan for his concubine, it takes the densely populated place as the Clan. In Western Zhou Dynasty, the King Xuan of Ji Jing once granted his concubine with Xie Shui waterfront in the South-West of Luoyang. After the King Ping of Ji Yijiu transferred to Luoyang, these clan people also moved to Gongqiu (old Yunzhou, present-day Ningyang, Shandong ). In memory of the old house, the concubine’s son for King Xuan also call the newly granted Gongqiu as Xie Qiu, after that, some Clan people take the densely populated place Xie Qiu as Clan, called Xie Qiu Clan, there was Xie Qiu Zhang at Lu State in Spring and Autumn Period.

Famous people with the surname Xie

Xie clan of Chen commandery
Xie An (謝安) (320–385), Statesman and Prime Minister of the Jin dynasty
Xie Daoyun (謝道韫) (340-399), Jin dynasty scholar, poet and debater
Xie Xuan (謝玄) (343-388), Duke of Kangle, Jin Dynasty general
Xie Lingyun (謝靈運) (385–433), Duke of Kangle, Jin Dynasty poet
Empress Xie Fanjing (謝梵境), Empress of the Liu Song Dynasty
Xie He (謝赫), Liu Song and Southern Qi writer, art historian and critic.

Politics and military
 Frank Hsieh (謝長廷), former Kaohsiung mayor, Premier of the Republic of China, and DPP's candidate for the 2008 ROC Presidency
 Hsieh Fa-dah (謝發達) (born 1950), Vice Minister of Economic Affairs of the Republic of China (2006-2008)
 Hsieh Shou-shing (謝曉星) (born 1950), Minister of Atomic Energy Council of the Republic of China
 Hsieh Tung-min (謝東閔) (1908-2001), Kuomintang politician and first native of Taiwan to become Vice-President of the Republic of China (Taiwan)
 Xie Fei (謝飛) (1913–2013), Chinese revolutionary, participant in the Long March and third wife of Liu Shaoqi
 Xie Fuzhi (谢富治) (1909-1972), Chinese Communist Party military commander and political commissar
 Xie Jinyuan (謝晉元), Commander of the Defense of Sihang Warehouse in the National Revolutionary Army of China during the Second Sino-Japanese War
 You Xie (謝盛友), CSU-political leader, German journalist and author of Chinese origin
 Xie Jianshun, Taiwanese intersex soldier
 Helen Zia, Asian-American journalist and activist
 Chia Yong Yong (谢邕邕), Singaporean lawyer and Member of Parliament
 Chia Thye Poh (谢太宝), Singaporean politician and former political prisoner
 Steve Chia (谢镜丰) (born 1970), Singaporean politician

Criminals
 Chia Teck Leng, Singaporean white-collar criminal
 Chia Kee Chen, Singaporean murderer

Entertainment and business
Xie Jin (谢晋) (1923-2008), film director
Tse Kwan Ho, (謝君豪) Actor of film, stage and television
Xie Na, (谢娜) Host, singer, actress
Michael Tse (謝天華), Hong Kong actor
Anthony Hsieh - Founder, Chairman & CEO of LoanDepot and later Founder of mello, also founded LoansDirect.com (sold to E-Trade) and HomeLoanCenter.com (merged with LendingTree)
Ming Hsieh (謝明), billionaire & founder of Cogent Systems and Fulgent Genetics, namesake of University of Southern California's Ming Hsieh Department of Electrical Engineering
Nicholas Tse (謝霆鋒), Hong Kong based singer and actor
Patrick Tse (謝賢), actor, producer, screenwriter and director in Hong Kong cinema.
Kenneth Tse (謝德骥), classical saxophone soloist
Kay Tse (謝安琪), Hong Kong singer
Xie Shaoguang (谢韶光), Singapore television actor
Fiona Xie (谢宛谕), Singaporean television actress
Amber Chia (谢麗萍), Malaysian model
Beau Sia (謝福源), Chinese-American slam poet.
Tony Hsieh, Zappos.com CEO
Timothy Tau Hsieh (謝韜), writer, filmmaker and law professor (his penname is Timothy Tau)
Jeffrey Cheah (謝富年), Founder and chairman of The Sunway Group of Companies in Malaysia.
Dhanin Chearavanont (谢国民), CEO of CP Group
 Jeannie Hsieh,  Taiwanese singer-songwriter, dancer, actress, and model
 Janet Hsieh, Taiwanese American television host
 Jade Seah (谢美玉) (born 1983), Singaporean model and actress
 Nelson Chia (谢燊杰), Singaporean theater director
 Yvonne Chia (谢姚依雯) (born 1953), Malaysian CEO
 Eric Chia (谢英福), Malaysian businessman
 Kimberly Chia (谢静仪), Singaporean actress
 Michelle Chia (谢韵仪) (born 1975), Singaporean actress

Literature and art
Xie Jin (謝縉) (1369–1415), Ming dynasty landscape painter and calligrapher
Dr. Cheah Thien Soong, Malaysian contemporary ink-painting artist
Xie Jun (谢军) (born 1970), two-time Women's World Chess Champion
Xie Zhe-Qing (謝哲青) (born 1973), Taiwanese literature and history scholar, travel writer
Timothy Tau Hsieh (謝韜) - novelist, short story writer, screenwriter & filmmaker (his penname is Timothy Tau)
Helen Zia - author, activist, journalist & writer

Sports
Xie Limei (谢荔梅), Chinese triple jumper
Xie Siyi (谢思埸), diver from the People's Republic of China
Xie Xingfang (谢杏芳), badminton player from the People's Republic of China
Xie Zhongbo (谢中博), badminton player from the People's Republic of China
Cheah Soon Kit (謝順吉) (born 1968), badminton player from Malaysia. 1986 Badminton Olympic Silver medalist
Cheah Liek Hou, para-badminton player from Malaysia. 2020 Para-Badminton Paralympic Gold medalist. 
Aaron Chia (謝定峰) (born 1997), badminton player from Malaysia. 
Hsieh Chia-hsien (謝佳賢), professional baseball player from Taiwan.
Hsieh Su-wei, professional tennis player from Taiwan.
Hsieh Chia-Han (born 1988), pole vaulter from Taiwan.
Chia Boon Leong (谢文龙) (1925–2022), Singaporean-Chinese footballer

Religion
Xie Shiguang (1917–2005), Chinese Catholic Bishop
Nicholas Chia (谢益裕), Roman Catholic Archbishop of Singapore
Mantak Chia (謝明德), Thai taoist master

Education
Shiuhpyng Shieh, National Chiao Tung University, Taiwan and Editor-in-Chief of IEEE Transactions on Reliability
Daniel Tse, University of Macau
T.H. Tse, The University of Hong Kong
Shieh You-hwa
David Tse, Stanford University

See also
 Chea

References 

Chinese-language surnames
Individual Chinese surnames